Koritnica is a village on the right bank of the Bača River in the Municipality of Tolmin in the Littoral region of Slovenia.

Name
Koritnica was attested in written sources in 1377 as Coritinicha. Like related names (e.g., Koritnice, Koritno, and Korita), the name is derived from the common noun korito 'trough; river bed', referring to the configuration of a local river or stream.

Trivia
The village was one of the filming locations for the 1948 film On Our Own Land.

References

External links 

Koritnica on Geopedia

Populated places in the Municipality of Tolmin